The Tauber Valley Cycleway, official name in German: Liebliches Taubertal (der Klassiker), in English Lovely Tauber Valley (the Classic), also Charming Tauber Valley (the Classic), is a German bicycle path running about 101 km along the River Tauber in Franconia, Germany. The cycleway runs from Rothenburg ob der Tauber via Bad Mergentheim and Tauberbischofsheim to Wertheim at the confluence of the Tauber and the Main. The path runs along its whole length through the valley of the Tauber and has only gentle ascents. At both ends and along the route there are railway stations. The General German Bicycle Club (ADFC) rated the trail five stars in 2009, the second path in Germany to receive this award after Main Cycleway.

Routes and variants

Charming Tauber valley (classic)
From Rothenburg ob der Tauber (or from Wertheim in the other direction) this popular bicycle tour runs along the "Lovely Tauber valley" (also "Charming Tauber valley"), to Weikersheim, Bad Mergentheim, Lauda, Tauberbischofsheim and finally Wertheim, just u reach just over 100 kilometres away. Th recommended daily stages of the "Charming Tauber Valley (Classic)" route are:
 1st day's stage - Rothenburg ob der Tauber to Weikersheim (or Bad Mergentheim)
 2nd day's stage - (Weikersheim via) Bad Mergentheim to Tauberbischofsheim
 3rd day's stage - Tauberbischofsheim to Wertheim

Charming Tauber valley (sportive)
From Wertheim (or from Rothenburg ob der Tauber in the other direction), you can cycle back to the starting point in five recommended extra stages of the route "Charming Tauber Valley (Sportive)":
 1st day's stage - Wertheim to Freudenberg
 2nd day's stage - Freudenberg to Külsheim
 3rd day's stage - Külsheim to Boxberg
 4th day's stage - Boxberg to Niederstetten
 5th day's stage - Niederstetten to Rothenburg ob der Tauber

Connections with other cycling paths
 A connection with the Main Cycleway in Wertheim.

Further reading
 Guides and maps
 Bikeline: Liebliches Taubertal: Der Klassiker - Der Sportive: Zwischen Rothenburg ob der Tauber und Wertheim. Esterbauer, Rodingersdorf, 2013, .
 Publicpress: Radwanderkarte Radweg Liebliches Taubertal, fanfold map with tourist destinations, tips on eating and leisure. Weatherproof, rip-proof, washable, GPS compatible, 1:50,000 scale.  Publicpress-Verlag, Geseke, 2007, .
 Fairy tales and legends
 Hans Werner Siegel (ed.), Hugo Pahl: Zwischen Tag und Dunkel: Sagen u. Geschichten aus dem Taubergrund. Verein Tauberfränkische Heimatfreunde e.V., Tauberbischofsheim, 1982.
 Fiction
 Reiner Röber: Mord im lieblichen Taubertal: ein Tauberfrankenkrimi. TRIGA - Der Verlag Gerlinde Heß, Gründau-Rothenbergen, 2013, .

External links
 The bicycle path Charming Tauber Valley in OpenStreetMap
 Touristic Information about the bicycle path Charming Tauber Valley
 Guide of the bicycle path Charming Tauber Valley
 BicycleRoutes&Tours: Charming Tauber Valley (Classic), with GPS-Informations and more.
 Map of the bicycle path Charming Tauber Valley

References

Cycling in Germany
Cycleways in Germany